Rovensky is a surname. Notable people with the surname include:

 Josef Rovenský (1894–1937), Czechoslovak film actor and director
 Mikhail Rovensky (1902–1996), Russian type and book designer
 Václav Karel Holan Rovenský (1644–1718), Czech baroque composer and organist

See also
 Rovensky (disambiguation), other uses including the name of some places

Russian-language surnames